Zeno of Verona (about 300 – 371 or 380) was either an early Christian Bishop of Verona or a martyr. He is a saint in the Roman Catholic Church and in the Orthodox Church.

Life and historicity
According to a Veronese author named Coronato, a notary of the 7th century, Zeno was a native of Mauretania. He taught many children of Africa about the Catholic religion and he also helped them with their school work. The children could rely on someone who could help them. Another theory is that Zeno was a follower of Athanasius, patriarch of Alexandria, who accompanied his master when the latter visited Verona in 340.

The style of the 90 or so Sermones attributed to Zeno has also been considered evidence of his African origins due to its literary style, since Christian African writers of the time frequently used neologisms and wordplay. Many of the Sermones concern Old Testament exegesis and "have a definite anti-Semitic element in them". This opinion is not shared by Giuseppe Laiti, expert on San Zeno’s tractatus.
 
Staying in the city, Zeno entered the monastic, living as a monk until around 362, when he was elected successor to the See of Verona after the death of Bishop Gricinus (Cricinus, Cricino).

Zeno had "received a good classical education", and as bishop baptized many people, won converts back from Arianism, lived a life of poverty, trained priests to work in the diocese, set up a convent for women, reformed how the Agape feast was celebrated, and forbade funeral masses being accompanied by attendees' loud groans and wailing. Zeno's other reforms included instructions concerning adult baptism (which occurred by complete immersion) and issuing medals to people newly baptized to the Catholic faith.

Zeno's episcopate lasted for about ten years, and the date of his death is sometimes given as 12 April 371.

Zeno is described as a confessor of the faith in early martyrologies. Saint Gregory the Great calls him a martyr in his Dialogues; Saint Ambrose, a contemporary of Zeno, does not. Ambrose speaks of Zeno's "happy death", although as a confessor, Zeno may have suffered persecution (but not execution) during the reigns of Constantius II and Julian the Apostate. The entry in the current Roman Martyrology  lists him on 12 April, but makes no mention of martyrdom.

The first evidence for his existence is found in a letter written by Saint Ambrose to Bishop Syagrius of Verona in which Ambrose refers to the holiness of Zeno. Later, Bishop Saint Petronius of Verona (r. 412–429) wrote of Zeno's virtues and also confirmed the existence of a cult dedicated to Saint Zeno.

A poem written between 781 and 810, called the Versus de Verona, an elegy of the city in verse, states that Zeno was the eighth bishop of Verona.

Veneration

Zeno's liturgical feast day is celebrated on 12 April, but in the diocese of Verona, it is also celebrated on 21 May, in honor of the translation of his relics on 21 May 807. 

Tradition states that Zeno built the first basilica in Verona, situated in the area probably occupied by the present-day cathedral. His eponymous church in its present location dates to the early ninth century, when it was endowed by Charlemagne and his son Pepin, King of Italy. It was consecrated on 8 December 806; two local hermits, Benignus and Carus, were assigned the task of translating Zeno's relics to a new marble crypt. King Pepin was present at the ceremony, as were the Bishops of Cremona and Salzburg, as well as an immense crowd of townspeople.

The church was damaged at the beginning of the tenth century by Hungarians, though the relics of Zeno remained safe. The basilica was rebuilt again, and made much larger and stronger. Financial support was provided by Otto I, and it was re-consecrated in 967, at a ceremony presided over by the Bishop Ratherius of Verona.

The present church of San Zeno in Verona is a work of the twelfth, thirteenth and early fifteenth centuries for the most part. It is well known for its bronze doors (c. 1100 – c. 1200) which depict, besides stories from the Bible, the miracles of Saint Zeno, images drawn from stories, including those recorded by the notary Coronato, the facade sculpture signed by Nicholaus and an associate Guglielmus, and the rose window (c. 1200), which is the work of Brioloto.

Legends and iconography

Zeno is the patron saint of fishermen and anglers, the city of Verona, newborn babies as well as children learning to speak and walk. Some 30 churches or chapels have been dedicated to him, including Pistoia Cathedral.

According to legend he was stolen at birth and briefly replaced by a demonic changeling.  One story relates that Saint Zeno, one day fishing on the banks of the Adige, which he did in order to feed himself (rather than as recreation), saw a peasant crossing the river in a horse and cart. The horses began to get strangely skittish. Zeno, believing this to be the work of the devil, made the sign of the cross, and the horses calmed down. Zeno was often said to combat the devil, and is sometimes depicted treading on a demon. Another story relates that he exorcised a demon from the body of the daughter of the Emperor Gallienus (though Zeno probably did not live during the reign of Gallienus). The story relates that the grateful Gallienus allowed Zeno and other Christians freedom of worship in the empire.

Saint Gregory the Great, at the end of the 6th century, relates a miracle associated with the divine intercession of Zeno. In 588, the Adige flooded its banks, inundating Verona. The floodwater reached the church dedicated to Saint Zeno, but miraculously did not enter it, even though the door was wide open. The church was donated to Theodelinda, an alleged eyewitness to the miracle and wife of king Authari.

Zeno is most often represented with fishing-related items such as a fish, fishing rod, or as a bishop holding a fishing rod, or with a fish hanging from his crozier.  "Local tradition says the bishop was fond of fishing in the nearby river Adige," writes Alban Butler, "but it is more likely that originally it was a symbol of his success in bringing people to baptism."

References 

 Nicholas Everett, Patron Saints of Early Medieval Italy AD c.350-800 (PIMS/ Durham University Press, 2016), pp. 60–72.

External links

Patron Saint index
The Lives or the Fathers, Martyrs and Other Principal Saints as reprinted by Eternal Word Television Network
Documenta Catholica Omnia 
San Zeno (Zenone) di Verona 
Zeno of Verona – Following the footsteps of a saint in Europe: article series with photographic documentation and maps 

Saints from Mauretania Caesariensis
Italian saints
4th-century deaths
Bishops of Verona
4th-century Christian martyrs
4th-century Romans
300 births
4th-century Berber people
Berber Christians
4th-century Latin writers